Thornes Park is a large public park situated close to the centre of Wakefield, West Yorkshire, England. Along with Clarence Park and Holmfield Park it forms a large parkland to the south west of the city.

The park hosts a model railway, formal gardens, a lake, an indoor leisure centre and an athletics track. The park also has 60 hectares of open spaces and a two-mile circular walkway around the park.

A mound lies in the centre of the park, once part of an old motte-and-bailey castle, which offers views across the city.

See also
Listed buildings in Wakefield

References

Parks and commons in Wakefield